Siniša Vukonić (born 4 October 1971) is a Croatian cross-country skier. He competed at the 1992 Winter Olympics and the 1994 Winter Olympics.

References

1971 births
Living people
Croatian male cross-country skiers
Olympic cross-country skiers of Croatia
Cross-country skiers at the 1992 Winter Olympics
Cross-country skiers at the 1994 Winter Olympics
Sportspeople from Rijeka